Frank Leslie's Popular Monthly (1876–1904) was an American popular literary magazine established by Frank Leslie as "the cheapest magazine published in the world." The publisher was Frank Leslie Pub. House which was based in New York City.

Contributors included Henry James and Eben E. Rexford. In 1905 it was continued by The American Magazine.

References

External links
 Hathi Trust. Frank Leslie's Popular Monthly, fulltext

1876 establishments in the United States
1904 disestablishments in the United States
Monthly magazines published in the United States
Defunct literary magazines published in the United States
Magazines established in 1876
Magazines disestablished in 1904
Magazines published in New York City